Cornereva is a commune in Caraș-Severin County, western Romania with a population of 3,403 inhabitants. It is composed of forty villages: Arsuri, Bogâltin (Bogoltény), Bojia, Borugi, Camena (Kamenavölgy), Cireșel, Costiș, Cozia, Cracu Mare, Cracu Teiului, Cornereva, Dobraia, Dolina, Gruni (Grúny), Hora Mare, Hora Mică, Ineleț (Inelec), Izvor, Lunca Florii, Lunca Zaicii, Mesteacăn, Negiudin, Obița, Pogara, Pogara de Sus, Poiana Lungă, Prisăcina, Prislop, Ruștin, Scărișoara, Strugasca, Studena, Sub Crâng, Sub Plai, Topla (Topla), Țațu, Zănogi, Zbegu, Zmogotin and Zoina.

According to the 2002 census, 100% of the population is ethnic Romanian, and 99.9% of inhabitants are Romanian Orthodox.

References

Communes in Caraș-Severin County
Localities in Romanian Banat